Ri Jong-ok (10 January 1916 – 23 September 1999) was a North Korean politician who served as the Premier of North Korea from 1977 to 1984.

He was elected to the Presidium at the 6th WPK Congress in 1980.

He was appointed as Vice President of North Korea by the Supreme People's Assembly in January 1984 and he left the office in October 1997.

Ri died on 23 September 1999. On his funeral committee were Kim Yong-nam, Pak Song-chol, Hong Song-nam and others. He was the recipient of the Order of Kim Il-sung, Order of the National Flag (first class), Order of Freedom and Independence (first class) and other honors.

See also
 Politics of North Korea

References

1916 births
1999 deaths
Vice presidents of North Korea
Korean communists
Korean independence activists
North Korean atheists
People from North Hamgyong
Prime Ministers of North Korea
Recipients of the Order of Kim Il-sung
Members of the 6th Presidium of the Workers' Party of Korea
Members of the 3rd Central Committee of the Workers' Party of Korea
Members of the 4th Central Committee of the Workers' Party of Korea
Members of the 5th Central Committee of the Workers' Party of Korea
Members of the 2nd Supreme People's Assembly
Members of the 3rd Supreme People's Assembly
Members of the 4th Supreme People's Assembly
Members of the 5th Supreme People's Assembly
Members of the 6th Supreme People's Assembly
Members of the 7th Supreme People's Assembly
Members of the 8th Supreme People's Assembly
Members of the 9th Supreme People's Assembly